Sahlabad or Sehlabad may refer to:
 Sahlabad, Chaharmahal and Bakhtiari
 Sahlabad, East Azerbaijan
 Sahlabad, Arsanjan, Fars Province
 Sahlabad, Estahban, Fars Province
 Sahlabad, Firuzabad, Fars Province
 Sahlabad, Abarj, Marvdasht County, Fars Province
 Sahlabad, Ramjerd-e Do, Marvdasht County, Fars Province
 Sahlabad, Shiraz, Fars Province
 Sahlabad, Markazi
 Sahlabad, Nishapur, Razavi Khorasan Province
 Sahlabad, Quchan, Razavi Khorasan Province
 Sahlabad, South Khorasan
 Sahlabad, Yazd